Nuvvala Nenila is a 2014 Telugu film starring Varun Sandesh and Poorna in the lead roles. The movie is directed by Trinadha Rao Nakkina and it is his second film with Varun Sandesh after Priyathama Neevachata Kushalama. Induri Rajasekhar Reddy produced the film while Sai Karthik would score the Music. The Movie would start its regular shooting from 13 February 2013.

Plot

Cast
 Varun Sandesh as Krishna Mohan
 Poorna as Mahalakshmi
 Sridhar
 Dhanraj
 Sonia Birji
 Uttej
 Vennela Kishore

Soundtrack

Production
The movie was formally launched in Ramanaidu Studios, Hyderabad and Sampath Nandi and Murali Mohan graced the event. Trinadh Rao said that the film will go on floors on 18 February and the movie will be completed in three schedules.

Reception 
A critic from The Times of India wrote that "Nuvvala Nenila could have easily been a good romantic entertainer, if only there was some great chemistry between the lead actors".

References

External links 
 

2014 films
2010s Telugu-language films
Films directed by Trinadha Rao Nakkina
Films scored by Sai Karthik